Gelasius of Nilopolis was an Egyptian Christian abbot who lived during the 5th century. He was one of the Desert Fathers and served as an abbot in Nilopolis during the mid-5th century.

Gelasius was a strong supporter of Juvenal of Jerusalem and adhered to the Council of Chalcedon.

Gelasius of Nilopolis is venerated as a saint by Eastern Orthodox churches. His feast day is December 31.

See also
Council of Chalcedon

References

5th-century deaths
Egyptian Christian monks
Saints from Roman Egypt
Eastern Catholic saints
Coptic Orthodox saints
Egyptian abbots
Desert Fathers